is a railway station in Kirishima, Kagoshima, Japan.

Lines

Layout 
The station consists of an island platform serving two tracks with a siding all on an embankment. The station building, located at the base of the embankment, is a modern structure built of timber in traditional Japanese style to resemble the nearby Kirishima-Jingū Shrine. From the station building, a tunnel leads under the embankment and up a flight of steps to the island platform.

Management of the passenger facilities at the station has been outsourced to the JR Kyushu Tetsudou Eigyou Co., a wholly owned subsidiary of JR Kyushu specialising in station services. It staffs the ticket booth which is equipped with a POS machine but does not have a Midori no Madoguchi facility.

Platforms

JR

Adjacent stations

History
In the next phase of expansion, the track was extended eastwards, with Kirishima-Jingū opening as the new eastern terminus on 10 July 1930. On 6 December 1932, the entire stretch of track from Kokura through this station to Kagoshima was redesignated as the Nippō Main Line. With the privatization of Japanese National Railways (JNR), the successor of JGR, on 1 April 1987, the station came under the control of JR Kyushu.

Nearby places
Kirishima-Jingū Shrine
Kirishima Onsen
Kirishima Post office
Kirishima City Hall Kirishima Branch
Kirishima Junior High School
Ota Elementary School

See also
List of railway stations in Japan

References

External links
Kirishima-Jingū (JR Kyushu)

Railway stations in Japan opened in 1930
Railway stations in Kagoshima Prefecture